Aaron John Rossi (born December 6, 1980) is an American drummer, most notable for his performance with industrial metal band Ministry and heavy metal band Prong. He was nominated for a Grammy at the 52nd Grammy Awards in 2010.

Discography
John 5
 Songs for Sanity (2005)

Ankla
 Steep Trails (2006)

Prong
 Power of the Damager (2007)
 Power of the Damn Mixxxer (2009)

Ministry
 Adios... Puta Madres (live album, 2009)
 From Beer to Eternity (2013)

References

 
 myspace.com/ministrymusic

1980 births
American heavy metal drummers
American people of Italian descent
American male drummers
Living people
Musicians from Rhode Island
People from South Kingstown, Rhode Island
American rock drummers
21st-century American drummers
21st-century American male musicians
Prong (band) members
Ministry (band) members